Sandrine Soubeyrand (born 16 August 1973) is a French former footballer and current coach of France women's national under-17 football team. She played as a midfielder for France national team, Félines Saint-Cyr, Caluire and Juvisy.

At club level, Soubeyrand won two Division 1 Féminine titles and a Coupe de France Féminine with Juvisy and received the UNFP Female Player of the Year in 2003. At international level with France, she played in two FIFA Women's World Cup, five UEFA Women's Championship and one Olympic Games.

Soubeyrand is the nation's most capped football player (male or female) in history with 198 appearances and a recipient of the National Order of Merit.

Personal life
Soubeyrand studied at INSEP to become a sports educator and is a school director for extracurricular activities in Juvisy-sur-Orge (Essonne).
In December 2012, she was nominated Chevalier (Knight) of the National Order of Merit for her services to French football, Valérie Fourneyron (France Minister of Sports) presented her with the insignia on 5 February 2013 in Évry.

Club career

Early career
Soubeyrand began playing at the age of 6 for local club Boulieu-lès-Annonay in the département of Ardèche. At the age of 13, she joined FC Félines Saint-Cyr in Saint-Cyr where she spent seven years.

Caluire
In August 1994, she arrived in Caluire-et-Cuire (Greater Lyon) to play for Caluire Saint-Clair SC of the National 1B (second division). In her first season (1994–95), the club won the National 1B title and was promoted to the National 1A for the 1995–96 season. She remained with the club in the National 1A for the following seasons until the club's relegation at the conclusion of the 1999–00 season.

Juvisy
Ahead of the 2000–01 season, she joined National 1A club FCF Juvisy in the département of Essonne (Parisian Region). She helped the club finish the 1A in third (2000–01) and runners up (2001–02). France re-branded the National 1A to Division 1 Féminine (D1) in the 2002–03 season. Soubeyrand won the D1 inaugural season, scoring seven goals and, for her seasonal performances, was named the league's top player by the UNFP.

She made her European debut at the 2003–04 UEFA Women's Cup, where she played three matches and scored two goals, both against Polish side AZS Wrocław. The club finish that season's D1 in third place.

Juvisy finish as D1 runners up in 2004–05 and won the French Cup, beating Olympique Lyonnais (Lyon) in the final. After a 1–1 draw, the match was decided on penalty shoot-out, Soubeyrand took Juvisy's third shot which was saved by Lyon's goalkeeper Hope Solo, despite the non-conversion, Juvisy won 5–4.

She won the D1 for a second time in 2005–06 and played all 22 matches. In the following season, she played 21 matches in the D1 to finish third and one match in the 2006–07 UEFA Women's Cup. She was D1 runner up in 2007–08 and played 21 matches.

At the 2008–09 season, despite being 35 years old, Soubeyrand appeared in 20 of the club's 22 matches and scored seven goals helping Juvisy finish in third, one point shy of qualifying for the newly created UEFA Women's Champions League (re-branding of the UEFA Women's Cup).

In the following season, Soubeyrand took part in all 22 games in the league, scoring and assisting three goals. In the same season, Juvisy managed to qualify for the UEFA Women's Champions League but merely missed out on the league title to defending champions Lyon.

In the 2010–11 season with Juvisy, she participated in 21 league games, managing to go goalless, but assisting six goals. This was only the second time in her career with the club since 2001 that she did not score a league goal in a season. She finished the season in fourth place and also played in the Champions League, participating in nine games, scoring twice to reached the quarter-final stage, being badly beaten and knocked out of the competition 9–2 on aggregate against the finalists Turbine Potsdam.

In the 2011–12 season, Soubeyrand finished runners up once again with Juvisy, behind league winners Lyon.

In 2012–13, she ended the season in third place with Juvisy, but managed to go all the way to the semi-finals in the 2012–13 UEFA Women's Champions League where they suffered a heavy 9–1 defeat on aggregate to fellow country club Lyon.

In the 2013–14 league season, she finished third once again with Juvisy, assisting ten goals and scoring one. Sandrine retired after Juvisy's final league game of the 2013–14 season at the age of 40 after enjoying a 14-year spell at Juvisy, including over 280 matches played in all competitions, two league titles (2002–03 and 2005–06 seasons), a French Cup title (2004–05), and participated in the UEFA Women's Cup and the re-branded UEFA Women's Champions League.

International career
As a Caluire SC player, Soubeyrand was called up for France women's national football team and made her international debut on 12 April 1997 in a 3–0 friendly match victory over Belgium. Later that year she took part on the UEFA Women's Euro 1997, playing all France's three matches in the tournament.

She played five matches at the 1999 FIFA Women's World Cup qualification, scoring her first goal on 11 April 1998 in a 3–2 defeat to Italy.

Over the following years she established herself as a capable midfielder, becoming a consistent presence in the French squads, accumulating appearances with the national team and eventually becoming the team's captain. Apart from major tournaments, she played in numerous friendlies and smaller international tournaments, such as qualifications for major tournaments, Algarve Cups and Cyprus Cups.

On 28 October 2009, she earned her record 143rd career international cap in a match against Estonia. The achievement surpassed French men's international defender Lilian Thuram as the nation's most capped football player.

After 16 years with the national team, Soubeyrand retired from international football at the age of 39, on 22 July 2013 after a 1–1 draw with Denmark. She played 198 matches (186 in the starting line up and 12 as incoming substitute) and scored 18 goals. Major tournaments played includes two FIFA Women's World Cups (2003 and 2011), five UEFA Women's Championships (1997, 2001, 2005, 2009 and 2013) and one Olympic Games (2012).

Coaching career
In 2014, she was appointed coach of France women's national under-17 football team.

Career statistics

Club

International

Scores and results list France's goal tally first, score column indicates score after each Soubeyrand goal.

Honours
Juvisy
Division 1 Féminine: 2002–03, 2005–06
Coupe de France Féminine: 2004–05

France
Cyprus Cup: 2012

Individual
UNFP Female Player of the Year: 2002–03

Orders
Chevalier of the Ordre national du Mérite: 2011

References

External links
 
 
 France player profile  

1973 births
Living people
French women's footballers
France women's international footballers
Paris FC (women) players
FIFA Century Club
2003 FIFA Women's World Cup players
2011 FIFA Women's World Cup players
Footballers at the 2012 Summer Olympics
Olympic footballers of France
Sportspeople from Ardèche
Women's association football midfielders
Female association football managers
Knights of the Ordre national du Mérite
Division 1 Féminine players
French football managers
Footballers from Auvergne-Rhône-Alpes